Kasanova is a 2019 Nigerian romantic comedy film directed by Oluseyi Asurf and produced by Eddy Young with Faith Ojo as its Executive Producer. The film was primarily shot in Lagos, Nigeria. It stars Wale Ojo, Iretiola Doyle and Toyin Abraham in the lead roles. The film was premiered at the Filmhouse Cinema on 11 September 2019. The film had its theatrical release on 13 September 2019 and opened to highly positive reviews. The film became a box office success and was the highest grossing Nigerian film in September 2019.
The soundtrack “Don’t Let Go” was performed by British-Nigerian artist Mr DiL

Synopsis 
Femi (Wale Ojo), a single dad falls in love with Jessica (Iri Doyle), who is a single mother. The couple fall in love through their children and it ensures there is a battle for love, family and friendship. In fact, Jessica is the music teacher of Femi's son Jason (Alvin Abayomi) and it causes a conflict of interest between the father and son.

Cast 

 Wale Ojo as Femi
 Iretiola Doyle as Jessica
 Alvin Abayomi as Jason (Femi's son)
 Toyin Abraham as Bisola
 Ruby Akubueze as Ini
 Chinezie Imo as friend
 Ayo Makun as lecturer
 Binta Ayo Mogaji as Mama
 Helen Paul as lecturer
 Tomiwa Tegbe as friend

Box office 
The film collected ₦4.9 million in the opening weekend and grossed a sum of ₦7.9 million in the opening week since its release.

References

External links 

 

2019 films
2019 comedy films
English-language Nigerian films
Films shot in Nigeria
2010s English-language films
Nigerian romantic drama films
Nigerian comedy-drama films